Come Back, Little Sheba is a 1977 videotaped television film production of the play of the same name by William Inge produced by Granada Television as part of the anthology series Laurence Olivier Presents transmitted in the UK by ITV on 1 January 1978. The selected plays were intended to represent "the best" in 20th Century theatre, staged for television. It aired in the United States on NBC on 31 December 1977.

The original play premiered on Broadway in 1950 and was subsequently filmed in 1952. In this version, the cast is led by Laurence Olivier as Doc Delaney and Joanne Woodward as Lola, and features Carrie Fisher as Marie, Patience Collier as Mrs. Coffman, Jay Benedict as Bruce, and Nicholas Campbell as Turk. It was directed by Silvio Narizzano.

The play was released as part of a 6-DVD set of Laurence Olivier Presents, which also includes Cat on a Hot Tin Roof, The Collection, Saturday, Sunday, Monday and Hindle Wakes.

References

External links
 

1977 television films
1977 films
1977 television plays
1977 drama films
ITV television dramas
American plays adapted into films
Television shows based on plays
Television series by ITV Studios
Television remakes of films
Filmed stage productions
Films directed by Silvio Narizzano
1970s British films
British drama television films